Love Song (Italian: Canzone d'amore) is a 1954 Italian musical film directed by Giorgio Simonelli and starring Claudio Villa, Maria Fiore and Walter Santesso.

The film's sets were designed by the art director Saverio D'Eugenio.

Cast
 Claudio Villa as Sandro 
 Maria Fiore as Lidia 
 Bruna Corrà as Ada 
 Walter Santesso as Mario 
 Silvio Noto
 Beniamino Maggio
 Maria Laura Rocca
 Alberto Talegalli
 Maria Zanoli
 Giulio Battiferri
 Aristide Catani
 Milvia Chianelli
 Rosetta D'Este
 Cesare Fantoni
 Armando Furlai
 Ettore Jannetti
 Gianni Luda
 Vittoria Mongardi
 Cristina Pall
 Mario Passante
 Emilia Ristori
 Rita Simoni

References

Bibliography 
 Chiti, Roberto & Poppi, Roberto. Dizionario del cinema italiano: Dal 1945 al 1959. Gremese Editore, 1991.

External links 
 
 Love Song at Variety Distribution

1954 films
Italian musical films
1954 musical films
1950s Italian-language films
Films directed by Giorgio Simonelli
1950s Italian films